Vice Academy was a series of six comedy films, which aired on the USA Network throughout the 1990s, particularly on their Up All Night programming block. Created by director Rick Sloane of Hobgoblins fame, the cast included former porn star Ginger Lynn, scream queen Linnea Quigley, Elizabeth Kaitan and Julia Parton.

The films were intended as a sexy spoof-on-a-spoof of Charlie's Angels and the popular Police Academy movie series. The first film follows the three main girls as they train at the academy; the later films follow them on their assigned missions.

Films

Production
In the second film, Didi is promoted, Linnea Quigley leaves the series.

In the third film, Holly is in prison; shortly after production ended, Lynn was arrested for tax evasion and served 4½ months. It was also her last film in the series.

Elizabeth Kaitan joins the cast as Didi's younger sister, Candy. It is also the only installment in which Jayne Hamil does not appear as Devonshire, with Jordana Capra in her place.

The fifth film introduces Raelyn Saalman as Holly's younger sister, Traci.

Reception
Critics were harsh on the films: Sandra Brennan of Allmovie said, "This tale wavers on the fine line between erotic comedy and soft-core porn with a definite leaning toward the latter." Sloane argues against this, saying that there's no sex and only ten seconds of nudity.

Critic Nathan Shumate commented, "Knowingly insipid to the point of being grotesque... It's a bad, bad, stupid movie, but somehow it fails to grossly offend, mainly because it doesn't try that hard."

Accolades
The first film has the distinction of winning USA Networks' B-Movie Awards for Best Picture and being their highest-rated late-night film when it first aired on cable television.

Home media
The films were originally released on video by Prism Entertainment, then on individual DVDs by Madacy Entertainment and later in two box sets by Brentwood Communications.

The DVD releases have bonus material such as a making-of, trailers, interviews with Sloane and the cast, and a director's commentary.

All six films are available on streaming via the Full Moon Features service.

References

External links
 Vice Academy Part 3 at IMDb
 Vice Academy Part 4 at IMDb

1980s police comedy films
American comedy films
Films directed by Rick Sloane
1990s police comedy films
1990s English-language films
1980s English-language films